This is a list of the recipients of the Bangla Academy Literary Award from 2020 to 2029.

2020 
10 persons were awarded.

 Ferdousi Mazumder (autobiography)
 Muhammad Samad (poetry)
 Imtiar Shamim (literary fiction)
 Begum Akhtar Kamal (essay/research)
 Suresh Ranjan Basak (translation)
 Rabiul Alam (drama)
 Anjir Liton ( children's literature)
 Sahida Begum (research on Liberation War)
 Aparesh Bandhopaddhaya (science fiction)
 Muhammad Habibullah Pathan (folklore).

2021 
15 persons were awarded:

 Asad Mannan (poetry)
 Bimal Guha (poetry)
 Jharna Rahman (literary fiction)
 Bishwajit Chowdhury (literary fiction)
 Hosenuddin Hossain (essay/research)
 Aminur Rahman (translation)
 Rafiq-Um-Muneer (translation)
 Sadhana Ahmed (drama)
 Rafiqur Rashid (children's literature)
 Panna Kaiser (research on Liberation War)
 Harun-or-Rashid (Bangabandhu affairs research)
 Shuvagata Chowdhury (science/science fiction/environmental science)
 Sufia Khatun (autobiography/memoir/travel stories)
 Haider Akbar Khan Rono (autobiography/memoir/travel stories)
 Aminur Rahman Sultan (folklore)

2022 
15 persons were awarded.

Faruk Mahmud and Tarik Sujat (poetry)
Tapas Majumder and Parvez Hossain (fiction)
 Masuduzzaman (essay/research)
 Alam Khorshed (translation)
 Milon Kanti Dey and Farid Ahmed Dulal (drama)
 Dhruba Esh ( children's literature)
 Muhammad Shamsul Haque (research on Liberation War)
 Subhash Singha Roy (research on Bangabandhu)
 Mokarram Hossain (science fiction)
 Iktiar Chowdhury (autobiography or travelogue)
 Abdul Khaleq and Muhammad Abdul Jalil (folklore)

References

Bengali literary awards
Bangladeshi literary awards
Lists of award winners
Civil awards and decorations of Bangladesh